Nevera may refer to:

 Rimac Nevera, an all-electric battery powered hypercar from Rimac Automobili
 Nevera (album), a 2000 pop-rock album by All Stars Osvajači
 La Nevera (lake), The Three Eyes National Park, Santo Domingo Este, Dominican Republic
 The Neveras, two ruined Moorish domes in La Vall d'Alcalà, Marina Alta, Alicante, Valencia, Spain
 The Neveras, archaeological domes in Fuendetodos, Campo de Belchite, Aragon, Spain

See also

 
 Never (disambiguation)
 Nevada (disambiguation)